King's Highway 16, commonly referred to as Highway 16 and historically as the Prescott Highway, is a provincially maintained highway in the Canadian province of Ontario. The highway once travelled from near Prescott to Ottawa, traversing the distance between the St. Lawrence River and the Ottawa River. However, its length was truncated significantly when most of the route was twinned with a second roadway, and renumbered as Highway 416. A short stub remains through Johnstown, crossing the St. Lawrence on the Ogdensburg–Prescott International Bridge to Ogdensburg, New York, where it becomes New York State Route 812.

The Ottawa–Prescott Road was one of the first highways designated in Ontario; it was one of three designated by 1918. The highway was numbered in August 1925. By then, it was mostly paved, except for portions south of Kemptville, which were paved by 1930. It immediately became the primary route between Toronto and Ottawa, via Highway 2, and as such saw many improvements and realignments carried out through the next three decades. In the 1960s, plans arose for a controlled-access highway to connect Highway 401 with Ottawa, which resulted in the construction of a complete realignment of Highway16 north of Johnstown, known as Highway16 New. This two-lane highway was built between 1969 and 1983; enough land was purchased for a second two-lane road to twin the highway, which was completed between 1989 and 1999, after which the route was renumbered with a 400-series designation.

Former portions of Highway16 can be followed north from Johnstown, through Spencerville and Kemptville to the Rideau River along Leeds and Grenville County Road 44. Beyond the River it followed Ottawa Road5 to North Gower, and thereafter Ottawa Road73 (Prince of Wales Drive) into downtown Ottawa.

History 

Early impetus for a route connecting Ottawa to the St. Lawrence River began with lobbying by automobile clubs in the early 1910s.
The Prescott Highway was established as a provincial highway in 1918, shortly after The Provincial Highway (which would become Highway2). The  Ottawa–Prescott Highway was assumed by the Department of Public Highways (DPHO) on August15.
The new route was initially in an unfit condition for traffic. For example, the 1918 DPHO Annual Report noted that in North Gower Township, the road "was in places very narrow and the sides grown up with brush and small trees. The road surface was in very bad shape."
Work began immediately to clear, widen, grade, and gravel the route, which was in many cases only -wide from overgrown fence line to overgrown fence line.
By mid-1923, the route was paved through Spencerville and North Gower, and work was underway to pave it within Manotick.

Until the summer of 1925, Ontario highways were named rather than numbered. When route numbering was introduced, the Prescott Highway became Provincial Highway16.
That year also saw it paved through Kemptville to the Rideau River, as well as beyond North Gower in to Ottawa. This left gaps in the pavement south of Kemptville (except through Spencerville), and from the Rideau River to the village of North Gower.
On October22, 1928, the pavement between Johnstown and Spencerville was completed and opened to traffic.
Premier Howard Ferguson officially opened the completed highway on October 7, 1929, at a rail overpass south of Kemptville. After cutting a ribbon spanning the bridge, he dubbed the route the Prince of Wales Highway.

Highway 16 New 

In 1966 the Eastern Ontario Highway Planning Study was published by the Department of Highways (DHO), the predecessor to today's Ministry of Transportation of Ontario (MTO), identifying the need for a controlled-access highway between Ottawa and Highway 401.
Highway16, which crosses the geologically subdued St. Lawrence Lowlands, was selected over Highway15, which crosses the undulating Canadian Shield to the west, as the ideal route for the new link.
To overcome the issue of abutting properties established along the Highway16 corridor, the DHO began purchasing a new right of way between Highway401 and Century Road by late 1967 and constructed a two lane bypass of the original alignment, avoiding all the built up areas that the original Highway16 encountered. This route was designed to easily accommodate the eventual upgrade to a freeway when traffic volumes necessitated.

Construction of the Super two, dubbed "Highway 16 New", took place between 1969 and 1983. The Spencerville Bypass opened by 1971, connecting with the old highway in the south near Crowder Road and in the north near Ventnor Road.
By the end of 1973 the new highway was completed from immediately north of Highway401 through Leeds and Grenville United Counties and into Ottawa–Carleton. This included a bypass around Kemptville and a new structure over the Rideau River.
The new highway ended at Dilworth Road (Regional Road13).

For nearly a decade, no new construction took place. Then, during the summer of 1982, the MTO awarded a contract to begin constructing the route north from Dilworth Road towards Manotick, bypassing North Gower. Following the completion of this first contract, which extended the route as far north as Roger Stevens Drive (Regional Road6) and included a structure over Stevens Creek, a second contract was awarded for the remaining distance north to Century Road (Regional Road8).
The project was completed in 1983, merging into the original route of Highway16 northeast of the present Prince of Wales Drive overpass.

Highway 416 

With the completion of Highway16 New, there was sufficient right-of-way to construct interchanges and the southbound lanes in order to create a full freeway corridor. A short section through downtown Ottawa was not incorporated into Highway416, instead being redesigned as Ottawa Regional Road 73 (Prince of Wales Drive), North of Prince of Wales Drive, a new freeway alignment was built alongside Borisokane Road and Cedarview Drive to connect with Highway 417 (The Queensway). This left a short stub through Johnstown, which remains designated as Highway 16.

Route description 

Highway16 is now a very brief route, though it was much longer before the construction of Highway416 truncated it. The highway begins near the shores of the St. Lawrence River in Johnstown at the former Highway 2, now Leeds and Grenville County Road2.
From there it travels northwest adjacent to the Ogdensburg-Prescott International Bridge, which lies to the southwest. A customs plaza lies at the end of the bridge, north of which the road to the bridge meets the highway; to the northeast is single-detached housing. The highway continues, exiting Johnstown and curving slightly towards the north.

Immediately after crossing over a Canadian National track, the route encounters an interchange with Highway401 at Exit721B. This interchange features full access to Highway401, including movements not possible at the Highway416 interchange to the west. North of the interchange, the road curves gently to the northwest, intersecting Cedar Grove Road. After this, the opposing directions of travel diverge and become ramps to northbound and from southbound Highway416.

Major intersections

References

016